Mehadica is a commune along Mehadica river in Caraș-Severin County, Banat region, in western Romania. It is composed of a single village, Mehadica, with a population of 922 people.

References

Communes in Caraș-Severin County
Localities in Romanian Banat